The 1995 SCCA Pro Racing World Challenge season was the sixth running of the Sports Car Club of America's World Challenge series. The season marked the start of a long reign of Honda in the touring car classes. The classes were changed from World Challenge, Touring Car, and Super Production to Sport, Touring, and Super Production.

Results

References

GT World Challenge America